Cancillopsis liliformis is a species of sea snail, a marine gastropod mollusk, in the family Mitridae, the miters or miter snails.

Distribution
This species occurs in the following locations:
 Philippines
 Taiwan Strait

References

 Huang S.-I [Shih-I] & Chuo Q.-Y. [Qing-You]. (2019). Thirteen new species of Mitridae from Taiwan and the Indo-West Pacific Ocean (Mollusca: Gastropoda). Visaya. 5(3): 73-102.

liliformis
Gastropods described in 2017